AP-1 complex subunit sigma-1A is a protein that in humans is encoded by the AP1S1 gene.

Function 

The protein encoded by this gene is part of the clathrin coat assembly complex which links clathrin to receptors in coated vesicles. These vesicles are involved in endocytosis and Golgi processing. This protein, as well as beta-prime-adaptin, gamma-adaptin, and the medium (mu) chain AP47, form the AP-1 assembly protein complex located at the Golgi vesicle. Two alternatively spliced transcript variants of this gene, which encode distinct isoforms, have been reported.

A mutation in the AP1S1 causes the rare familial MEDNIK syndrome described in 2008.

Interactions 

AP1S1 has been shown to interact with AP1G1 and RAB10.

References

Further reading

External links